Yevgeny Alexeyevich Lalenkov (born February 16, 1981, in Angarsk) is a Russian former long track speed skater who participated in international competitions. He won a silver medal at 1000m at the 2008 single-distance World Championships in Nagano.

He married speed skater Evgeniia Lalenkova.

Personal records

Career highlights

Olympic Winter Games
2006 - Turin, 7th at 1000 m
2006 - Turin, 23rd at 1500 m
2006 - Turin, 5th at team pursuit
2010 - Vancouver, 36th at 500 m
2010 - Vancouver, 23rd at 1000 m
2010 - Vancouver, 10th at 1500 m
World Allround Championships
2002 - Heerenveen, 10th
2003 - Göteborg, 5th
2004 - Hamar, 8th
2005 - Moscow, 12th
World Sprint Championships
2006 - Heerenveen, 10th
2007 - Hamar, 10th
World Single Distance Championships
2002 - Salt Lake City, 23rd at 1000 m
2002 - Salt Lake City, 10th at 1500 m
2003 - Berlin, 4th at 1500 m
2004 - Seoul, 7th at 1500 m
2005 - Inzell, 8th at 1500 m
2008 - Nagano,  2nd at 1000 m
European Allround Championships
2003 - Heerenveen, 7th
2004 - Heerenveen, 6th
2005 - Heerenveen, 14th
2008 - Kolomna,  9th
World Junior Allround Championships
1999 - Geithus, 17th
2000 - Seinäjoki, 6th
World Cup
2002 - Inzell,  2nd at 1500 m
2002 - Hamar,  1st at 1500 m
2002 - Erfurt,  2nd at 1500 m
2002 - Heerenveen,  2nd at 1500 m
2003 - Baselga di Pinè,  1st at 1500 m
2003 - Baselga di Pinè,  3rd at team pursuit
2003 - Heerenveen,  1st at 1500 m (March)
2003 -  1st at World Cup Rankings 1500 m
2003 - Heerenveen,  1st at 1500 m (November)
2003 - Heerenveen,  3rd at 3000/5000 m allround
2004 - Heerenveen,  3rd at 1500 m
2004 -  3rd at World Cup Rankings 1500 m
National Championships
2001 - Divnogorsk,  3rd at 1500 m
2001 - Divnogorsk,  3rd at 1000 m
2002 - Berlin,  3rd at 1500 m
2002 - Berlin,  1st at 1000 m
2003 - Kirov,  2nd at allround
2004 - Chelyabinsk,  2nd at allround
2004 - Nizhni Novgorod,  3rd at 500 m
2005 - Moscow,  2nd at allround
2006 - Moscow,  1st at 1500 m
2006 - Moscow,  1st at 1000 m
2006 - Moscow,  1st at team pursuit
Nordic Junior Games
1999 - Helsinki,  1st at 1000 m
1999 - Helsinki,  3rd at 1500 m
2000 - Chemnitz,  2nd at 1500 m
2000 - Chemnitz,  2nd at 3000 m
2000 - Chemnitz,  1st at 1000 m
Nordic Neo Senior Games
2001 - Kolomna,  3rd at 5000 m
2001 - Kolomna,  1st at 1500 m

External links
 Lalenkov at Jakub Majerski's Speedskating Database
 Lalenkov at SkateResults.com
 

1981 births
Russian male speed skaters
Living people
Olympic speed skaters of Russia
Speed skaters at the 2002 Winter Olympics
Speed skaters at the 2006 Winter Olympics
Speed skaters at the 2010 Winter Olympics
People from Angarsk
Sportspeople from Irkutsk Oblast